Ferenc Máté (born 1945, in Hungarian Transylvania) grew up in Budapest. He escaped Hungary with his mother after the crushing of the 1956 revolution by Soviet tanks. He graduated from the University of British Columbia, and worked on a railroad extra-gang, on tugboats, and as boat-builder, then became photographer, book editor, and writer. He has lived in Vancouver, Laguna Beach, Whistler Mountain, New York City, Paris, and Rome, and now resides on a wine estate in Tuscany with his wife, painter and winemaker Candace Máté, and their son, Peter. 

For much of their first twenty years together, Máté and his wife lived on sailboats, traveling the world, photographing and occasionally publishing books on sailing. His first book, From a Bare Hull, written when he was 28, was cited by Yachting Magazine as "worthy of a much older man with a lifetime of boat-building experiences." It is still considered one of the best books on boat-building ever written. In addition to sailing books, Máté has written three memoirs about moving to Tuscany and adjusting to Italian life. The first, The Hills of Tuscany, (1999) was an international bestseller translated into 15 languages. It recounts their first three years, ("Charming, …lively…Titanic in appeal," — Washington Post,) while the second, A Vineyard in Tuscany, is the story of their converting an 800-year-old abandoned friary and its lands into a now world-acclaimed winery. Vineyard, was cited by The New Yorker as: “muscular prose…cool, robust and determined”. It was a New York Times notable book, and was shortlisted for Spain’s prestigious El Cid literary award. The third in the series, The Wisdom of Tuscany: Simplicity, Security and the Good Life—(W.W. Norton & Company; 20 October 2009) examines our chaotic, crises-driven society and offers the best alternatives based on centuries-old Tuscan tradition. He emphasizes the importance of small communities, independence, closeness to nature, and good food and good wine, as important factors in a healthy and happy lifestyle.

His book-length essay, the critically acclaimed A Reasonable Life (1992.) often vitriolic, often laugh out loud entertaining, warning us about the social and environmental impact of the excesses of modern society, foreshadowed by 25 years the calamity of runaway global consumerism. It was concisely summed up thus by Charles Bowden, author of Desierto: “A Reasonable Life will look insane to any normal American. Which shows how crazy we’ve become. Read it—you might get a life.” Pete Seeger wrote, “I hope everyone, especially the young, get to read a copy.”
Màtè’s first novel, Ghost Sea (W. W. Norton, 2006) set in the Kwakiutl Islands south of Alalska, began a series of anthropological thrillers during the early 20th century, involving an outlaw sea captain, Dugger and his sardonic first mate, Nello, eking out a life around the world in a 60-foot ketch.  It was hailed by Walter Cronkite as, “One of the most dramatic sailing adventures of all time.” While Booksense called it “an unnerving and highly charged…masterful evocation of a time and place you’ll not forget.” The second volume, Sea of Lost Dreams, set in the Marquesas, was a National Geographic Travel selection. The upcoming third, Sea of the Golden Dead, chronicles the revolution fraught last days of the British Empire in Burma and Ceylon. 
“In each volume, I try to capture the dying days of an ancient civilization,” Màtè wrote. 
His forthcoming non-fiction thriller, The Lost City of Tuscany, is a narrative of the centuries-long hunt for the treasure-laden Etruscan sanctuary of Fanum Veltha, the Etruscan’s long lost, sacred city that has been an obsession of historians, archeologists, adventurers, and grave robbers since Roman times.

Books by Ferenc Máté
From A Bare Hull: How To Build A Sailboat (1975)
Waterhouses (1977)
The Finely Fitted Yacht: The Boat Improvement Manual, Volumes 1 and 2 (1978)
Shipshape: Art of Sailboat Maintenance (1982)
The World's Best Sailboats (Volume 1 1987, Volume 2 2003)
Best Boats to Build to Build or Buy (1982)
Seven Seas Sailors' Calendars, (annually since 1985)
A Reasonable Life: Toward a Simpler, Secure, More Humane Existence (1992)
The Hills of Tuscany: a new life in an old land (1999)
Autumn: A New England Journey (2001)
Ghost Sea: A Dugger/Nello Novel (2006)
A Vineyard in Tuscany: A Wine Lover's Dream (2007)
The Wisdom of Tuscany: Simplicity, Security and the Good Life (2009)
A New England Autumn: A Sentimental Journey (2010 W.W. Norton)
"Sea of Lost Dreams: A Dugger/Nello Novel (2011)
"A Real Life, Restoring What Matters: Family, Good Friends and a True Community (2011)
Islands of Eden, St Vincent and the Grenadines (2012)
The Lost city of Tuscany (autumn 2020)
The Power of Darkness (a novel, 2021)
The Sea of the Golden Dead: a Dugger/Nello novel (2022)

References

http://www.worldhum.com/features/travel-books/the-death-of-the-idyll-20091030/

External links
https://www.ferencmate.com/
https://www.matewine.com/
https://www.youtube.com/watch?v=n-NqqIPZZQo
https://www.nytimes.com/2007/12/02/books/review/Travel-t.html
https://www.newyorker.com/magazine/2008/01/07/a-vineyard-in-tuscany

1945 births
Hungarian writers
Living people
Maritime writers
Nautical historical novelists